Babylon Babies is the third novel by French-born Canadian writer Maurice G. Dantec, published in 1999. It follows La Sirène rouge (1993) and Les Racines du mal (1995).

Plot
Set in 2013, the main character, Hugo Cornelius Toorop (hero of The Red Siren), is a mercenary whose mission is to escort a young woman with schizophrenia, Marie Zorn, from Siberia to Quebec on behalf of a sect. It appears that the young woman is the surrogate mother of twins, representing the next stage of human evolution.

Publication
The novel was published by Gallimard on 12 March 1999 in the collection La Noire. A paperback edition was then published on 4 April 2001 in the collection Folio SF.

Film adaptation

Mathieu Kassovitz and Éric Besnard developed an English-language adaptation of Dantec's novel with financing from StudioCanal and Twentieth Century Fox. Vin Diesel was cast to play the lead.

See also
 The Red Siren

References

External links
 

1999 Canadian novels
Cyberpunk novels
Canadian science fiction novels
Fiction set in 2013
Canadian novels adapted into films
Novels by Maurice G. Dantec
Science fiction novels adapted into films